The Ljubljanica Sluice Gate, or the Partition, is a sluice gate and a triumphal arch on the Ljubljanica River in Ljubljana, the capital of Slovenia. It is located between Cukrarna (a former sugar factory) and Vraz Square in the Center District, east of the Ljubljana old town, a bit downstream of Ambrož Square. It was designed in 1939 by the Slovene architect Jože Plečnik, who envisaged it as a monumental farewell to the Ljubljanica River on its exit from the Ljubljana city centre. It was planned to be used as a footbridge as well. The sluice gate was built with difficulty from 1940 until 1943 by the constructor Matko Curk. Since July 2009, it has been protected as a monument of national significance, along with other major works by Plečnik.

References

External links

Bridges in Ljubljana
Bridges completed in 1943
Jože Plečnik buildings
Sluice gate
Center District, Ljubljana
Triumphal arches
Arch bridges in Slovenia
20th-century architecture in Slovenia